The Glad Fact is the debut studio album by experimental rock band Dirty Projectors. Like other Dirty Projectors albums, The Glad Fact contain recurring symbols of finches and cars. Most songs are closer to the style of The Graceful Fallen Mango than the heavier bass and glitch-style songs of The Getty Address or simple ballads on Slaves' Graves and Ballads. Western Vinyl issued the album as both a digipak CD and a 12" vinyl; the vinyl included an unlisted bonus track between "Ground Underfoot" and "Spirit-Future Medley". Both versions feature the image of a naked man sitting down, although the CD has the band's name on the front whereas the vinyl has it on the back.

Track listing

References

2003 debut albums
Dirty Projectors albums
Western Vinyl albums
Albums produced by David Longstreth